Bernard Rands (born 2 March 1934 in Sheffield, England) is a British-American contemporary classical music composer. He studied music and English literature at the University of Wales, Bangor, and composition with Pierre Boulez and Bruno Maderna in Darmstadt, Germany, and with Luigi Dallapiccola and Luciano Berio in Milan, Italy. He held residencies at Princeton University, the University of Illinois, and the University of York before emigrating to the United States in 1975; he became a U.S. citizen in 1983. In 1984, Rands's Canti del Sole, premiered by Paul Sperry, Zubin Mehta, and the New York Philharmonic, won the Pulitzer Prize for Music. He has since taught at the University of California, San Diego, the Juilliard School, Yale University, and Boston University. From 1988 to 2005 he taught at Harvard University, where he is Walter Bigelow Rosen Professor of Music Emeritus.

Rands has received many awards for his work, and was elected and inducted into The American Academy of Arts and Letters in 2004. From 1989 to 1995 he was composer-in-residence with the Philadelphia Orchestra. Rands's music is widely recorded.  The recording of his Canti D'Amor by the men's vocal ensemble Chanticleer won a Grammy Award in 2000. Rands is married to American composer Augusta Read Thomas.

Works

Opera

Belladonna (1999)
opera in two acts, with a libretto by Leslie Dunton Downer, commissioned by the Aspen Festival. Première: 1999, Aspen Music Festival, Colorado
Vincent (c.1973-2010)
opera based on the life of Vincent van Gogh, with libretto by J. D. McClatchy, commissioned by Indiana University. Première performances: 8–9, 15–16 April 2011, Bloomington, Indiana.

Orchestral
Per esempio (1968)
commissioned by the West Riding Youth Orchestra, Yorkshire
Wildtrack 1 (1969)
commissioned by the BBC Symphony Orchestra for the 1969 York Festival, premièred under Pierre Boulez (dedicated to Gilbert Amy)
Agenda (1970)
commissioned by the Department of Education and Science for the London Schools Symphony Orchestra
Metalepsis 2 (1971), for mezzo-soprano, small choir & chamber orchestra
commissioned by the London Sinfonietta, who gave the première in 1972 with soprano Cathy Berberian, conducted by Luciano Berio at the English Bach Festival
Mésalliance (1972), for piano solo & orchestra
commissioned by the BBC Symphony Orchestra, premièred by pianist Roger Woodward under Pierre Boulez
Wildtrack 2 (1973), for soprano solo & orchestra
commissioned by the BBC Symphony Orchestra, and premièred at the 1973 Cheltenham Festival under John Pritchard.
Aum (1974), for harp solo & chamber orchestra
commissioned by the BBC Symphony Orchestra for Pierre Boulez's series of contemporary concerts at Roundhouse, London
Madrigali (1977), for chamber orchestra
commissioned by the National Symphony Chamber Orchestra, Washington D.C., and premièred at the Kennedy Center. The work has most recently been performed by the Jungen Philharmonie Zentralschweiz and the University of Nottingham Philharmonia.
Canti Lunatici (1981), for soprano solo & orchestra
commissioned by the BBC Symphony Orchestra for soprano Dorothy Dorow, premièred under Rands in 1981
Canti del Sole (1983), for tenor solo & orchestra
full version commissioned by the New York Philharmonic, and premièred under Zubin Mehta and tenor Paul Sperry in 1983. The work won the 1984 Pulitzer Prize for Music.
Le Tambourin: Suites 1 & 2 (1984)
the two suites were commissioned respectively by the Fromm Foundation for the San Diego Symphony and the Koussevitzky Foundation for the Philadelphia Orchestra, who premièred the complete work under Riccardo Muti in 1984. The work was awarded first place in the 1986 Kennedy Center Friedheim Awards. The work has since been performed widely by many orchestras, including (most recently) the Buffalo Philharmonic.
Ceremonial 2 (1986)
15-minute work commissioned by Suntory Hall, Tokyo; premièred there in 1989
Fanfare for a Festival (1986)
commissioned by the Colorado Music Festival, Boulder, for the 10th anniversary festival
Hiraeth (1987), for cello solo & orchestra
commissioned by the Aspen Music Festival, premièred by cellist Yehuda Hanani with the Aspen Festival Orchestra conducted by Rands. Subsequent performances took place with Hanani the BBC National Orchestra of Wales soon after.
...body and shadow... (1988)
commissioned by the Boston Symphony Orchestra, and premièred under Seiji Ozawa at Symphony Hall in 1989. Emily Freeman Brown and the Bowling Green Philharmonia have since taken the work into their repertoire.
London Serenade (1988)
written as a gift for conductor Edwin London, who premièred the work with the Cleveland Chamber Symphony. Recent performances have been given by the Verge Ensemble and the Buffalo Philharmonic.
Bells (1989), for S.A.T.B. choir & orchestra
commissioned by the Northeastern Pennsylvania Philharmonic
Ceremonial 3 (1991)
commissioned by the Philadelphia Orchestra, premièred under Riccardo Muti. Subsequent performances have taken place by the Bristol University Symphony Orchestra
Canti dell'Eclisse (1992), for bass solo & orchestra
commissioned by the Philadelphia Orchestra, premièred under Gerard Schwarz with bass Thomas Paul. The work has since been championed by Gil Rose and the Boston Modern Orchestra Project.
Ceremonial (1992–93), for wind band
commissioned by the University of Michigan Symphony Band, Ann Arbor. A widely performed work, Ceremonial has most recently been performed by the Eastman Wind Ensemble and the concert bands of the Oberlin Conservatory, Boston Conservatory, Columbus State University, Yale University, New England Conservatory, DePaul University, University of Washington and Florida International University, among numerous others.
Tre Canzoni senza Parole (1993)
commissioned by the Philadelphia Orchestra, premièred under Rands in 1992. The Oregon Symphony has since championed this work.
...where the murmurs die... (1993)
commissioned by the New York Philharmonic, premièred under Leonard Slatkin at Avery Fisher Hall in December 1993
Canzoni (1995)
commissioned by the Philadelphia Orchestra, premièred under Wolfgang Sawallisch in Philadelphia. A further performance was given by the same forces at the 1995 BBC Proms in the Royal Albert Hall, London
Interludium (1995), for S.A.T.B. choir & orchestra
commissioned as part of the Requiem of Reconciliation, premièred in 1995 by the Israel Philharmonic under Helmuth Rilling
Symphony (1995)
commissioned by the Los Angeles Philharmonic, premièred under Esa-Pekka Salonen in 1995
Cello Concerto (1996)
commissioned by the Boston Symphony Orchestra for Mstislav Rostropovich, premièred under Seiji Ozawa in 1997. Recent performances have taken place at Symphony Center with the Chicago Symphony under Pierre Boulez, with cellist Johannes Moser.
Fanfare (1996)
commissioned by the Cincinnati Symphony
Requiescant (1996), for soprano solo, S.A.T.B. choir & orchestra
30-minute work, originally commissioned by the BBC for the 1985 Proms Season, but wasn't completed in time. It was recommissioned in 1995 for the Philadelphia Choral Society
Triple Concerto (1997), for piano, cello & percussion soli & orchestra
commissioned by the Core Ensemble and the Cleveland Chamber Symphony with funds provided by the Meet the Composer Consortium Program, premièred by those forces conducted by Edwin London
apókryphos (2002), for soprano solo, S.A.T.B. choir & orchestra
major 40-minute work setting texts by Paul Celan, Heinrich Heine, Nelly Sachs, Franz Werfel and English translations of extracts from the Apocrypha. Commissioned by the Chicago Symphony Orchestra and Chorus, and premièred at Symphony Center in May 2003 with soprano Angela Denoke under Daniel Barenboim (choral director: Duain Wolfe). Further performances have taken place in Germany and Austria in 2010, at the Berlin Philharmonie and the Konzerthaus, Großer Saal by the Staatskapelle Berlin and Staatsopernchor Berlin, again with Daniel Barenboim conducting.
Unending Lightning (2002), for wind band
commissioned by the Eastman School of Music
Chains Like the Sea (2008)
commissioned by the New York Philharmonic, premièred under Lorin Maazel at Avery Fisher Hall in October 2008
Danza Petrificada (2009–10)
commissioned by the Chicago Symphony and premièred under Riccardo Muti at Symphony Center, May 5–7 & 10, 2011.
Adieu (2010), for brass quintet & string orchestra
commissioned by the Seattle Symphony, due to première the work under Gerard Schwarz at Benaroya Hall, Seattle, Washington on 7 December 2010.

Chamber
Actions for Six (1962), for flute, viola, cello, harp & two percussion
written for the 1963 Darmstadt Festival; premièred by the Kranichsteiner Ensemble under Bruno Maderna
Espressione IV. (1964), for two pianos
premièred at the 1965 Darmstadt Festival by Aloys and Alfons Kontarsky
Ballad 1 (1970), for mezzo-soprano solo, flute, trombone, piano, percussion & contrabass
written for SONOR Ensemble, a group formed by Rands. Text by Gilbert Sorrentino.
Tableau (1970), for flute, clarinet, piano, percussion, viola & cello
as all get out (1972), for miscellaneous instrumental ensemble
notated as a graphic score; the duration of the work can be anywhere from 5 to 20 minutes
déjà (1972), for flute, clarinet, piano, percussion, viola & cello
Response - Memo 1B (1973), for contrabass & tape / two contrabassi
Cuaderno (1974), for string quartet
étendre (1974), for solo contrabass, flute, clarinet, horn, trumpet, trombone, piano, electric organ, percussion, violin, viola & cello
15-minute work, based on Rands' Memo 1 (for solo double bass, from 1971), and was written for bassist Bertram Turetzky and commissioned by the Claremont Festival, California.
Scherzi (1974), for clarinet, piano, violin & cello
commissioned by the Capricorn Ensemble with funds provided by the Arts Council of Great Britain
Obbligato - Memo 2C (1980), for trombone & string quartet
...in the receding mist... (1988), for flute, harp, violin, viola & cello
commissioned by the Arts Council of Great Britain for the ONDINE Ensemble, and is dedicated to Jacob Druckman on the occasion of his sixtieth birthday. Premièred in Washington D.C. in November 1988. Recent performances have been given by the Boston Musica Viva under Richard Pittman, the North/South Consonance Ensemble under Max Lifchitz, the Verge Ensemble (Buffalo, New York), the Dal Niente New Music Group (Chicago), and ensembles at the Indiana University School of Music and the Arizona State University.
...and the rain... (1992), for horn, harp, violin, viola & cello
String Quartet No. 2 (1994)
commissioned by the Philadelphia Chamber Music Society for the Mendelssohn Quartet (who, in 2003, recorded the work on BIS Records). The work has since been taken up by the Fifth House Ensemble, DePaul University, Chicago.
...sans voix parmi les voix... (1995), for flute, harp & viola
commissioned by the Chicago Symphony Orchestra Association in honour of the 70th birthday of Pierre Boulez
Concertino (1996), for oboe solo, flute, clarinet, harp, two violins, viola & cello
commissioned by Network for New Music with generous support from Anni Baker; premièred in 1998 conducted by Jan Krzywicki. Recent performances have taken place with the Dal Niente New Music Group (Chicago), the University of Illinois Urbana-Champaign New Music Ensemble, ensembles from the University of Nevada, the University of Iowa (who recorded the work on Capstone Records in 2006) and Yale University, and at the June in Buffalo Festival (New York).
Fanfare (1997), for brass quintet
commissioned by the Atlantic Brass Quintet
String Quartet No. 3 (2003)
commissioned by the Eastman School of Music (financial support from the Howard Hanson Foundation) for the Ying Quartet. Premièred by that ensemble in January 2004 at Symphony Space, New York
Prelude (2004), for flute, viola & harp
commissioned for the 2004 June in Buffalo Festival
...now again... (2006), for mezzo-soprano solo, flute, clarinet, trumpet, percussion, harp, violin, viola & cello
commissioned by Network for New Music, and premièred by that ensemble in November 2006 with mezzos-soprano Janice Felty
PRISM (Memo 6B) (2008), for saxophone quartet
10-minute work commissioned by the New York State Arts Council for the Prism Quartet. Premièred: 21 November 2008 in Philadelphia, by the same artists.
Scherzi No. 2 (2008), for clarinet, piano, violin & cello
18-minute work

Vocal
Ballad 1 (1970), for mezzo-soprano solo & ensemble
written for SONOR ensemble, a group formed by Rands. Text by Gilbert Sorrentino.
Ballad 2 (1970), for female voice & piano
commissioned by Jane Manning
Metalepsis 2 (1971), for mezzo-soprano solo, small choir & chamber orchestra
commissioned by the London Sinfonietta, who gave the première in 1972 with soprano Cathy Berberian, conducted by Luciano Berio at the English Bach Festival
Ballad 3 (1973), for soprano & tape (plus bell)
Wildtrack 2 (1973), for soprano solo & orchestra
Canti Lunatici (1980), for soprano & ensemble/orchestra
déjà 2 (1980), for female voice solo & ensemble
Canti del Sole (1984), for tenor solo & ensemble/orchestra
Canti dell'Eclisse (1992), for bass solo & ensemble/orchestra
Walcott Songs (2004), for mezzo-soprano & cello
song-cycle to texts by Derek Walcott, commissioned by the Tanglewood Summer Music Festival; premièred in the Seiji Ozawa Hall in January 2005 by Abigail Fischer (mezzo-soprano) and Norman Fischer (cello)
...now again... (2006), for mezzo-soprano & ensemble
commissioned by Network for New Music, and premièred by that ensemble in November 2006 with mezzos-soprano Janice Felty

Choral
...among the voices... (1988), for S.A.T.B. choir & harp
commissioned by Robert Page, who led the première in Cleveland in April 1988 with Paula Page (harp) and the Page Singers. Text by Samuel Beckett.
Bells (1989), for S.A.T.B. choir & orchestra
commissioned by the Northeastern Pennsylvania Philharmonic
Canti d'Amor (1991), for a cappella S.A.T.B. choir
commissioned by Chanticleer, premièred in 2000 in San Francisco by that group. Sets texts from James Joyce's Chamber Music.
Introit (1992), for a cappella S.A.T.B. choir
brief 2-minute work, commissioned by the Howard University Chapel. Text by George Herbert.
Interludium (1995), for S.A.T.B. choir & orchestra
commissioned as part of the Requiem of Reconciliation, premièred in 1995 by the Israel Philharmonic under Helmuth Rilling
Requiescant (1996), for soprano solo, S.A.T.B. choir & orchestra
30-minute work, originally commissioned by the BBC for the 1985 Proms Season but not completed in time. It was recommissioned in 1995 for the Philadelphia Choral Society
Melancholy Madrigal (2001), for a cappella S.A.T.B. choir
commissioned by the Cambridge Madrigal Singers, Massachusetts, premièred in 2001 in Cambridge by that group.
apókryphos (2002), for soprano solo, S.A.T.B. choir & orchestra
major 40-minute work setting texts by Paul Celan, Heinrich Heine, Nelly Sachs, Franz Werfel and English translations of extracts from the Apocrypha. Commissioned by the Chicago Symphony Orchestra and Chorus, and premièred at Symphony Center in May 2003 with soprano Angela Denoke under Daniel Barenboim (choral director: Duain Wolfe). Further performances have taken place in Germany and Austria in 2010, at the Berlin Philharmonie and the Konzerthaus, Großer Saal by the Staatskapelle Berlin and Staatsopernchor Berlin, again with Daniel Barenboim conducting.
My Child (2003), for a cappella S.A.T.B. choir
a movement from apókryphos
Trinity (2008), for a cappella male-voice choir
commissioned by the Cornell University Glee Club, and premièred under Scott Tucker in September 2008 in Ithaca, New York
Folk Songs (2014), an arrangement of songs of personal meaning, including "On Ilkley Moor Baht 'at" and "Mi Hamaca". Premiered under Karina Canellakis at the 2014 Tanglewood Festival of Contemporary Music.

Solo instrumental
Tre Espressione (1960), for piano
Formants 1 - Les Gestes (1965), for harp
Memo 1 (1971), for contrabass
commissioned by Barry Guy; premièred at the English Bach Festival, Oxford in 1972
Memo 2 (1973), for trombone
Memo 3 (1989), for cello
Memo 4 (1997), for flute
commissioned by Ekkehart Trenknner for Judith Pierce, who gave the work's première in 1997
Memo 5 (1975), for piano
Memo 6 (1999), for alto saxophone
Memo 7 (2000), for female voice
Memo 8 (2000), for oboe
HBDZ (2001), for piano
Preludes (2007), for piano
Three Piano Pieces (2010)

Music theatre
Ballad 2 (1970), for female voice & piano
commissioned by Jane Manning
Ballad 3 (1973), for soprano & tape (plus bell)
Memo 2B (1980), for trombone and female mime
Memo 2D (1980), for trombone, string quartet and female mime

Educational
Sound Patterns 1 (1967), for voices & hands
Sound Patterns 2 (1967), for voices, percussion and miscellaneous instruments
Per Esempio (1969), for youth orchestra
Sound Patterns 3 (1969), for voices (project)
Sound Patterns 4 (1969), for miscellaneous instrumental groups (graphic score)
Agenda (1970), for youth orchestra

Awards 
In 2014 Rands was inducted to The Lincoln Academy of Illinois as a Laureate of the Arts and was awarded the Order of Lincoln (the state's highest honor) by the governor of Illinois.

References

 Kennedy, Michael and Kennedy, Joyce Bourne (eds.) (2006) "Rands, Bernard" The Oxford Dictionary of Music (2nd rev.) Oxford University Press, Oxford,

External links
Bernard Rands official site
Bernard Rands page from Art of the States site
Interview with Bernard Rands, December 3, 1993

Listening
Art of the States: Bernard Rands two works by the composer

1934 births
Living people
Harvard University faculty
University of California, San Diego faculty
Princeton University faculty
Boston University faculty
20th-century classical composers
21st-century classical composers
American male classical composers
American classical composers
English emigrants to the United States
Pulitzer Prize for Music winners
Musicians from Sheffield
Pupils of Luigi Dallapiccola
Pupils of Luciano Berio
21st-century American composers
Academics of the University of York
20th-century American composers
20th-century American male musicians
21st-century American male musicians
Members of the American Academy of Arts and Letters